Ariel Standen Levis is a Chilean senior athlete champion, born on September 12, 1929, in Punta Arenas, son of the Methodist minister Carlos Standen and Nelly Levis, he is the first Chilean senior athlete who won a world senior title.

Career 
He spent his childhood in Temuco, Coquimbo, La Serena and Iquique. His first steps on athletics started in the local high school of Iquique  "Iquique English College", guided by his teacher José Scarzolo in the track and field and jumping. His first competition was in 1947 in Coquimbo. Without a pause, he competed from 1947 to 1962, winning 100 regional and zonal titles. Besides, he won several trophies, diplomas and medals.

In 1953, Standen was nominated to join the national pre-team  for the sudamerican Tournament in Brazil. After being accepted, he competed with the champion and record of the world Adhemar Ferreira Da Silva. 
His career was abruptly stopped in 1962 when he retired from athletics and from the national team due to problems with the federation about.

Triumphs 
On October 13, 1993, at the age of 64, Standen came back and achieved the senior athletics Championship in Miyazaki, Japan in the 300 meters hurdles. Then he won a bronze medal in the triple jump and 400 meters hurdles.  Proud of being the first Chilean  senior athlete champion, Standen gave thanks to Jorge Soria's collaboration (mayor of Iquique in that time) and  the club "Academia de Educación Física" who afforded  his stay in Japan.

Later, in  January 1994 he was given "the Cóndor" prize, by Círculo de Periodistas Deportivos de Chile and in 1995 he repeated his world titles in Buffalo, USA, then in 1997 in Durbai, South Africa. He got one of the first places in 100 and 300 meters hurdles and decathlon.

Besides to these triumphs, he won 15 South American senior titles in the categories of 55, 60 and 65 years old.

External links 

Iquique Siglo XX, a las puertas del Nuevo milenio
 Diario la Estrella de Iquique
Special edition, 2000
 http://buscador.emol.com/noticias/Ariel+Standen
 https://web.archive.org/web/20110102033559/http://www.fundacionasciende.com/publicaciones-de-fundacion-asciende/reportajes/157-ariel-standen-campeon-de-decatlon
 http://www.elmorrocotudo.cl/admin/render/noticia/37

1929 births
Living people
Chilean male hurdlers
People from Iquique